This list of tunnels in Croatia includes any road, rail or waterway tunnel in Croatia.

 Mala Kapela Tunnel, 5780 m, A1 motorway
 Sveti Rok Tunnel, 5679 m, A1 motorway
 Učka Tunnel, 5062 m, A8 motorway
 Sveti Ilija Tunnel, 4248 m, D532 state road
 Plasina Tunnel, 2300 m, A1 motorway
 Tuhobić Tunnel, 2141 m, A6 motorway
 Golubinka Tunnel, 1895 m, A1 motorway
 Brinje Tunnel, 1560 m, A1 motorway
 Javorova Kosa Tunnel, 1460 m, A6 motorway
 Grič Tunnel, 1231 m, A1 motorway
 Konjsko Tunnel, 1198 m, A1 motorway
 Veliki Gložac Tunnel, 1130 m, A6 motorway
 Podvugleš Tunnel, 610 m, A6 motorway
 Vrata Tunnel, 260 m, A6 motorway

See also
List of tunnels by location

Croatia
Tunnels
 
Tunnels